Sundy is a settlement in the northwestern part of Príncipe Island in São Tomé and Príncipe. Its population is 416 (2012 census). Sundy lies 5 km northwest of the island capital of Santo António. In 1822 the first cocoa plantation of the whole archipelago was established in Sundy. Several buildings of this plantation have been preserved.

Population history

References

Populated places in the Autonomous Region of Príncipe